Go Crazy! is the fourth Korean studio album (seventh overall) by South Korean boy band 2PM. The album was released in both physical and digital format on September 15, 2014 by JYP Entertainment.

Background
During the filming for the music of the group's upcoming comeback, a fire broke out on the set of the music video. Authorities stated later that the fire was relatively small and had been controlled by the time the fire team arrived; apparently it started when a spark from some fireworks which were being used in the music video landed on a sponge. All the members and staff present at the time were confirmed to be unharmed.

The comeback that was to be in April was postponed by JYP Entertainment and 2PM due to their individual activities. A JYP Entertainment rep told Newsen on the 14th that "2PM's comeback has been delayed for the time being. It will be in the latter-half of this year but the exact date has not been decided yet." [NEWSEN]

On August 28, Taecyeon, through his personal Twitter, released a photo of Nichkhun and Wooyoung. This was followed by Jun. K who released a photo of Taecyeon and Chansung on his Twitter. Next Wooyoung released a photo of Jun.K and Junho. These three photos hinted that their comeback was near. Next, insiders revealed that their comeback would be on September 15.

On September 1 (KST), JYP officially released the three teaser photos and one group photo for 2PM's comeback, as well as the date for their comeback, September 10. On September 3,  six more teaser photos was released (individual members' photos) ahead of their comeback.  On September 5, a teaser video was uploaded on JYP's YouTube channel. A party version teaser (2nd teaser video) was released on September 7.

The full track list for the normal edition and grand edition was released the next day. It is revealed that the normal edition consists of 11 tracks including two Korean versions of their Japanese singles, "Beautiful" and "I'm Your Man" which was released online on September 15 at 12am (KST). The grand edition was released on September 29 at 12pm (KST) with seven additional tracks, including three remixes of the title track "Go Crazy!".

On September 9, an album spoiler was uploaded on JYP's YouTube channel.

Music videos
The full music video was released on September 10, at 0000 (KST). A party version of the music video was released on September 15, at 12pm (KST).

Promotion
The group made their promotional appearance for the album on M.net's M! Countdown on September 11. This was followed by subsequent appearances on KBS's Music Bank (September 12), MBC's Show! Music Core (September 13), SBS's Inkigayo (September 14) and MBC Music's Show Champion (September 17).

Track listing

Charts and sales

Album chart

Sales

Singles

GO CRAZY!

Release history

References

External links 
 https://itunes.apple.com/us/album/michingeo-aniya-go-crazy!/id918945533
 
 
 
 
 
 
 
 미친거 아니야? on MelOn

2014 albums
2PM albums
JYP Entertainment albums
Genie Music albums
Korean-language albums